In the 2017 season Nevėžis has finished 7th amongst 15 teams in the Lithuanian First League. The season covers the period from 1 April 2017 to 21 October 2017.

Players

References

FK Nevėžis